John Wallace Houston (May 4, 1814 –  April 26, 1896) was an American lawyer and politician from Georgetown, in Sussex County, Delaware. He was a member of the Whig Party and the Democratic Party, who served as U.S. Representative from Delaware and a Justice of Delaware Superior Court.

Early life and family
Houston was born on May 4, 1814 in Concord, Delaware, attended the country schools and Newark Academy, and graduated from Yale College in 1834. While at Yale he was initiated into one of the earliest gatherings of the Skull and Bones Society. He studied law in Dover, Delaware and was admitted to the Delaware Bar in 1837. He then moved to Georgetown, Delaware in 1839 and commenced the practice of law. He was a slaveholder.

Professional and political career
Houston was Secretary of State of Delaware from 1841 to 1844, and was elected as a Whig to the 29th, 30th, and 31st Congress, serving from March 4, 1845 to March 3, 1851. While in the House he was chairman of the Committee on Public Buildings and Grounds for the 30th Congress. He was not a candidate for renomination in 1850, and was appointed associate judge of the Delaware Superior Court on May 4, 1855, retiring in 1893. Houston was a member of the Peace Conference of 1861, held in Washington, D.C. in an effort to devise means to prevent the impending Civil War.

Death and legacy
Houston died at Georgetown, and is buried in the Lewes Presbyterian Church cemetery at Lewes, Delaware. His nephew, Robert G. Houston, was also a U.S. Representative from Delaware.

See also
List of Skull and Bones Members

Almanac
Elections are held the first Tuesday after November 1. U.S. Representatives took office March 4 and have a two-year term.

References

Places with more information
Delaware Historical Society; website; 505 North Market Street, Wilmington, Delaware 19801; (302) 655-7161
University of Delaware; Library website; 181 South College Avenue, Newark, Delaware 19717; (302) 831-2965

External links 
Biographical Dictionary of the U.S. Congress
Delaware's Members of Congress
Find A Grave
The Political Graveyard

1814 births
1896 deaths
Yale College alumni
People from Dover, Delaware
Secretaries of State of Delaware
Delaware lawyers
Delaware Whigs
Members of the United States House of Representatives from Delaware
Associate Judges of Delaware
Burials in Sussex County, Delaware
Delaware Democrats
Whig Party members of the United States House of Representatives
19th-century American politicians
19th-century American judges
19th-century American lawyers